The 20th Division(1st Formation)() was created in March 1949 under the Regulation of the Redesignations of All Organizations and Units of the Army, issued by Central Military Commission on November 1, 1948, basing on the 12th Independent Brigade, 7th Column of PLA Northwestern Field Army. Its history could be traced to 12th Independent Brigade of Jinsui Military District formed in July 1948.

The division is part of 7th Corps. Under the flag of 20th division it took part in the Chinese civil war. In November 1950 it was disbanded and became 7th Artillery Training Base.

As of disbandment division was composed of:
58th Regiment;
59th Regiment;
60th Regiment.

References

Infantry divisions of the People's Liberation Army
Military units and formations established in 1949
Military units and formations disestablished in 1950